Insuetophrynus is a monotypic genus of frogs in the family Rhinodermatidae. The sole species is Insuetophrynus acarpicus, also known as Barrio's frog. It is endemic to Chile and only known from few localities on the Valdivian Coast Range between Chanchán in the Los Ríos Region in the south and Queule (southernmost Araucanía Region) and Colequal Alto in the north; the fourth locality is Mehuín, which is the type locality. The altitudinal range is  asl.

Description
Adult males measure  and females  in snout–vent length. The body is sturdy with muscular arms and legs (these frogs are powerful jumpers). The toes are partially webbed and thinner than the fingers which are short, thick, and unwebbed. The head is wider than long, with a broad, rounded snout. The eyes are large, and tympanum is visible but not large. The back is reddish brown with some whitish granulations. The hind legs have transverse, darker bands. The throat is pinkish yellow, and the stomach is pale. Skin is dorsally quite granular or warty. Also ventral region is also very granular, apart from the throat that is fairly smooth.

Habitat and conservation
Insuetophrynus acarpicus inhabits coastal streams in temperate forest. Adults hide under stones during the day, emerging at night to feed along the stream margins. Tadpoles can be found under stones in muddy areas with slow current.

The species has a small area of distribution (its known range extends only 33 km along the coast) and its habitat is threatened by clear cutting and afforestation.

References

Rhinodermatidae
Monotypic amphibian genera
EDGE species
Amphibians of Chile
Endemic fauna of Chile
[[Category:Amphibians
]]
Taxonomy articles created by Polbot